Sibinj railway station is a railway station on Novska–Tovarnik railway located in Sibinj, Brod-Posavina County. Railroad continued to Oriovac in one and the other direction to Slavonski Brod. Sibinj railway station consists of 6 railway tracks.

See also 
 Croatian Railways
 Zagreb–Belgrade railway

References 

Railway stations in Croatia
Buildings and structures in Brod-Posavina County